Pseudocolaspis utukuruensis is a species of leaf beetle of the Democratic Republic of the Congo, described by Brian J. Selman in 1972.

References

Eumolpinae
Beetles of the Democratic Republic of the Congo
Beetles described in 1972
Endemic fauna of the Democratic Republic of the Congo